Brister is a surname. Notable people with the surname include:

 Bubby Brister (born 1962), former American football quarterback
 Jen Brister (born 1975), stand-up comedian from South London
 Mark Brister, humanitarian, baptist pastor, and former university president
 Pat Brister (born 1946), business woman and Republican politician in St Tammany Parish, Louisiana
 Robert E. Brister, United States Navy officer during World War II
 Scott Brister (born 1954), former Justice of the Supreme Court of Texas
 T. C. Brister (1907-1976), former member of the Louisiana House of Representatives from Rapides Parish
 Wanda Brister (born 1957), American operatic mezzo-soprano and voice teacher